Norcem Brevik is a cement factory located at Brevik in Porsgrunn, Norway. Established as Dalen Portland Cementfabrikk in 1916, production commenced in 1919. The plant merged with Christiania Portland Cementfabrikk and Nordland Portland Cementfabrikk in 1968 to establish Norcem, which is now part of HeidelbergCement. The facility has an annual output of 1.2 million tonnes.

Cement companies of Norway
Companies based in Porsgrunn
Manufacturing companies established in 1916
1916 establishments in Norway
Norcem
Manufacturing companies disestablished in 1968
1968 disestablishments in Norway
1968 mergers and acquisitions